William Fleshmonger(? -1541/42), the son of a Winchester College tenant, was born  in Hambledon, Hampshire. He was a Doctor of Canon Law and Dean of Chichester during the turmoil of the English Reformation.

Education
Fleshmonger attended Winchester College and joined the chapel choir. In 1490, the college chapel had a staff of three chaplains and three lay clerks. The choristers assisted the priests by reading, serving and  singing in chapel.  Of 15 choristers, that year, nine became scholars including Fleshmonger. 

Winchester was a school where 70 scholars and a varying number of commoners were taught grammar and educationally prepared for further studies at New College, Oxford. After completing his education at Winchester Fleshmonger continued his studies at New College where he was a fellow between 1496 and 1514. Whilst at Oxford he read Canon law becoming a Doctor of Canon Law(D.C.L) in 1515. In 1525 he was made Doctor of Divinity (D.D.).

Career
Fleshmonger was a pluralist, holding several benefices at the same time. The positions he held were:

Other posts
He held the  Prebendaries of Torleton, in Sarum Diocese (1518-1541)  and Carlton cum Dalby in the Lincoln Diocese (1519-1541) also Vicar of St Leonard, Shoreditch(1525-1541) and Custos of St Mary's Hospital Chichester(1520-1541).

The Prebend of Selsey
There had been disputes over the income from the prebend of Selsey(mainly tithes) between the prebendaries of Selsey and the rectors of Selsey for some time. During Fleshmonger's incumbency at Selsey, the prebend of Selsey was held by William Norbury the Archdeacon of Chichester. The bishop of Chichester, Robert Sherborne settled the matter by a deed of composition issued on the 27 March 1526 that ordained that in future the rector should have all the rights, tithes and other emoluments, formerly held by the Prebend. In return the rector should pay £10 half yearly, to the prebend in perpetuity.

Dean of Chichester

During the later Middle Ages, in the Chichester Diocese, the bishop's authority had become limited by the multiplicity and complexity of jurisdictions. In the city of Chichester, the archbishop, bishop and dean exercised both ecclesiastical and temporal jurisdiction. Within the diocese there were many peculiar jurisdictions that limited the authority of the bishop. When Robert Sherborne was appointed Bishop of Chichester, he resolved to reorganise his diocese. One of the officers he appointed to help him achieve his aims was that of William Fleshmonger, who like  Sherborne, was a Wykehamist. Fleshmonger was Sherborne's chancellorand official principal until the mid-1520s. In 1529, the English Reformation Parliament proposed that canonical courts should be prohibited from trying all ex officio actions, other than heresy cases.

As dean of Chichester Fleshmonger presided over an ecclesiastical court that tried a certain John Hoggesflesh who had been accused of heresy in 1534. After a protracted trial, the court referred the case to Archbishop Cranmer who in turn referred it to the Duke of Norfolk, who in his turn referred it to Henry VIII.  The king confirmed that Hoggesflesh opinions were erroneous. Norfolk wrote to Sherborne on the 6 November to advise him of the kings decision:

So Hoggesflesh was forced to recant his ‘detestable opinions’ and do public penance in the cathedral and read out a declaration of his errors in the market places of Chichester, Midhurst, and Lewes.

The Almhouses

In the 12th century the Hospital of the Blessed Virgin Mary was founded in Chichester. A community of brothers and sisters cared for the sick and the poor who needed a bed for the night. The hospital was moved from its original location in 1253 to its current location in St Martin's square, Chichester.

Under William Fleshmongers tenure St Mary's hospital was reorganised in 1528. The warden of the hospital was to be a priest. The priest was to visit the hospital once a month to ensure that mass was celebrated. Accounts were to be produced once a year for the dean and chapter. After the reorganisation  it lost its hospital status. It became an almshouse with accommodation for five poor brethren and sisters ‘worn down with age and infirmity’. Fleshmonger is credited with being the almshouse founder and first custos.

Chichester Cathedral choir
In 1536 it cost the cathedral £17 6s 8d  (£17.333 modern equivalent) to accommodate and clothe the members of the choir, Fleshmonger provided 40s (£2 modern equivalent) a year subsidy to the choir to supply  'shurtes, hoses and shoys' .

Legacy
In 1548-49 (after Fleshmonger's death), the king under the abolition of chantries act  claimed Fleshmonger's annuity. However, an amicable arrangement was arrived at whereby the city of Chichester and it's cathedral benefited rather than the crown.

Notes

Citations

References

 
 
 
 	
 
 
 
 
 
 
 
 
 
 
 
 
 

Deans of Chichester
Anglican priests
1541 deaths
People educated at Winchester College
People associated with New College, Oxford
Alumni of New College, Oxford